Lutterworth High School is a coeducational academy school in the market town of Lutterworth, Leicestershire. It has an age range of 11–16. The school achieved an Ofsted rating of "Outstanding" in 2012.

History
The school was built in 1927 as a school for 11–14 year olds from the local community.

References

Academies in Leicestershire
Educational institutions established in 1927
Lutterworth
Secondary schools in Leicestershire
1927 establishments in England